Saint Joseph is the chief settlement of Dominica's St. Joseph Parish. Its population is 2,029.

References

External links

Populated places in Dominica
Saint Joseph Parish, Dominica